Pyronia cecilia, the southern gatekeeper, is a butterfly of Southern Europe and North Africa. It is a member of the subfamily Satyrinae in the family Nymphalidae.

Description
It is similar in appearance to the gatekeeper (P. tithonus), which is found further north, and the Spanish gatekeeper (P. bathsheba). The gatekeeper has spots on the underside of the hindwing which the southern gatekeeper lacks. The Spanish gatekeeper has quite a different underwing pattern with a prominent while band.

Sexual dimorphism
The southern gatekeeper, like many in subspecies Satyrinae, exhibits sexual dimorphism. The male is smaller than the female, the front wing of the male is 15 to 16 mm whereas a female front wing is 20 mm, and has a patch of scent-producing scales known as the androconia, which can be seen as a dark patch on the upperside of the forewing.

Distribution and habitat
The southern gatekeeper likes hot localities and is found in northern Africa and southern Europe; in Tunisia, Algeria, Morocco, Portugal, Spain including Mallorca and Menorca, south-eastern France, Corsica, Sardinia, Elba, Italy, Sicily, Croatia, Albania, Greece and Turkey. It is usually found in rough, open areas in lowland regions although in some areas it occurs up to 2000 m.

Food plants
Food plants are grasses including Deschampsia cespitosa

See also
List of butterflies of Menorca

References

Higgins, L.G., and Riley, N.D. (1970) Field Guide to the Butterflies of Britain and Europe. Collins, pp380.
Pons, G., (2000). Les papallones diurnes de les balears, 87pp. Edicions Documenta Balear, Palma de Mallorca.

External links
 Satyrinae of the Western Palearctic

Pyronia
Butterflies of Europe
Butterflies described in 1894
Butterflies of Africa